The 22nd Arabian Gulf Cup was the 22nd edition of the biennial football competition, and took place between 13 and 26 November 2014 in Riyadh, Saudi Arabia.

It was scheduled to take place in Basra, Iraq but was shifted after concerns over preparations and security. Iraq was also due to host the 2013 tournament, but this was moved to Bahrain instead. After being moved to Saudi Arabia, Jeddah was initially announced as the host city but was later moved to Riyadh.

Qatar won the cup by defeating  Saudi Arabia 2–1 in the final.

Teams and Draw 
The draw took place on 12 August 2014.

Eight teams were divided into two groups, Saudi Arabia (the host nation) were in group A, the United Arab Emirates (the holders) in group B, while the rest of the teams were placed in a pot based on FIFA ranking.

Notes

Venues

Squads

Group stage 

All times are local (UTC+03:00).

Group A

Group B

Knockout stage

Semi-finals

Third place play-off

Final

Winners

Goalscorers 

5 goals

 Ali Mabkhout

3 goals
 Said Al-Ruzaiqi

2 goals

 Abdulaziz Al-Muqbali
 Ali Assadalla
 Nasser Al-Shamrani
 Nawaf Al Abed
 Ahmed Khalil

1 goal

 Yaser Kasim
 Bader Al-Mutawa
 Fahad Al Enezi
 Yousef Nasser
 Ahmed Mubarak Al-Mahaijri
 Raed Ibrahim Saleh
 Almahdi Ali Mukhtar
 Boualem Khoukhi
 Hassan Al-Haydos
 Ibrahim Majid
 Fahad Al-Muwallad
 Salem Al-Dawsari
 Saud Kariri

1 own goal

 Abdulla Al-Haza'a (playing against Saudi Arabia)
 Mohamed Husain (playing against Saudi Arabia)

Team statistics 
This table shows all team performance.

Awards 
The following awards were given:

References

External links 
 22nd Arabian Gulf Cup Official site
  22nd Arabian Gulf Cup at Soccerway
  Schedule & Results (PDF)

 
2014
2014 in Asian football
2014–15 in Saudi Arabian football
2014–15 in Bahraini football
2014–15 in Omani football
2014–15 in Emirati football
2014–15 in Yemeni football
2014–15 in Kuwaiti football
2014–15 in Iraqi football
2014–15 in Qatari football
Arabian Gulf Cup
Arabian Gulf Cup